West Metro Fire Rescue provides fire protection and emergency medical services to communities in Douglas and Jefferson counties in Colorado. The district is located within the Denver metropolitan area. The department is also the sponsoring agency for the Urban Search and Rescue Colorado Task Force 1,  housed at West Metro's Training Center. In 2018, the department responded to 34,222 calls for service.

There rank structure looks like:

• Fire Chief 

• Deputy Fire Chief of Operations 

• Deputy Fire Chief of Administration 

• Deputy Fire Chief of Life Safety 

• Assistant Fire Chief 

• Battalion Chief 

• Captain 

• Lieutenant 

• Engineer 

• Firefighter 

• Probationary Firefighter 

• Recruit

History 
The district was established in 1995 following the merger of the Lakewood Fire Protection District and the Bancroft Fire Protection District.

In April 2016, the district grew with the absorption of the Wheat Ridge Fire Department into West Metro.

Stations and apparatus 
As of 2020, the district operates from the following 17 stations located throughout its service area.

References 

Fire departments in Colorado